Stakkars (Norwegian word for "poor" or "deserving of sympathy") is the eight studio album by Norwegian rock band deLillos.

Track listing
"Borte bra"
"I morgen"
"Psykopat"
"Mor"
"Treet"
"Smilet til Cecilie"
"Stakkars gutt"
"Fullstendig oppslukt av frykt"
"Bensin og kjærlighet"
"TV'n rasker over krisen"
"Alt for fort"
"Elektrisitet"

1997 albums
DeLillos albums
Sonet Records albums